The following discography is a comprehensive collection of albums, singles and guest appearances by Jagged Edge.

Albums

Studio albums

Compilation albums

Video albums

Singles

As lead artist

As featured performer

Guest appearances

References 

Discographies of American artists
Rhythm and blues discographies